The superficial palmar arch is formed predominantly by the ulnar artery, with a contribution from the superficial palmar branch of the radial artery.  However, in some individuals the contribution from the radial artery might be absent, and instead anastomoses with either the princeps pollicis artery, the radialis indicis artery, or the median artery, the former two of which are branches from the radial artery.

Alternative names for this arterial arch are: superficial volar arch, superficial ulnar arch, arcus palmaris superficialis, or arcus volaris superficialis.

The arch passes across the palm in a curve (Boeckel's line) with its convexity downward,

If one were to fully extend the thumb, the superficial palmar arch would lie approximately 1 cm distal from a line drawn between the first web space to the Hook of Hamate (Kaplan's Cardinal Line).  The superficial palmar arch extends more distally than the deep palmar arch. The connection between the deep and superficial palmar arterial arches is an example of anastomosis, and can be tested for using Allen's test.

Three common palmar digital arteries arise from the arch, proceeding down on the second, third, and fourth lumbrical muscles, respectively.  They each receive a contribution from a palmar metacarpal artery.  Near the level of the metacarpophalangeal joints, each common palmar digital artery divides into two proper palmar digital arteries.

Four digital branches arise from this palmar arch that supplies the medial/ulnar 3 1/2 fingers.

See also
 Deep palmar arch
 Palmar carpal arch
 Dorsal carpal arch

Additional images

Footnotes and references

References

External links
 
  - "Palm of the hand, superficial dissection, anterior view"

Arteries of the upper limb